Stanisław Małysa (born 20 June 1960) is a Polish weightlifter. He competed in the men's heavyweight II event at the 1988 Summer Olympics.

References

External links
 

1960 births
Living people
Polish male weightlifters
Olympic weightlifters of Poland
Weightlifters at the 1988 Summer Olympics
People from Radom County